Jason Martin (born December 12, 1972) is a former American football quarterback who played two seasons with the Grand Rapids Rampage of the Arena Football League. He played college football at Louisiana Tech University. He was also a member of the Barcelona Dragons of NFL Europe in 1998, and the Shreveport Knights of the short-lived Regional Football League in 1999.

References

External links
Just Sports Stats
College stats

Living people
1972 births
Players of American football from Louisiana
American football quarterbacks
Louisiana Tech Bulldogs football players
Barcelona Dragons players
Grand Rapids Rampage players
People from West Carroll Parish, Louisiana
Regional Football League players